Rizal (formerly known as Liwan), officially the Municipality of Rizal  is a 4th class municipality in the province of Kalinga, Philippines. According to the 2020 census, it has a population of 19,554 people.

The town is famous for its Pleistocene sites which possesses rhino bones, tools, deer bones, turtle remains, and stegodon bones. The butchered rhino bones were confirmed by international scientific journals as proof of ancient hominids in the Philippines dating back to 709,000 years ago, the oldest hominid evidence in the entire Philippine archipelago. The discovery was confirmed in 2018, and has been a game-changer in Philippine prehistory.

Geography

Barangays
Rizal is politically subdivided into 14 barangays. These barangays are headed by elected officials: Barangay Captain, Barangay Council, whose members are called Barangay Councilors. All are elected every three years.

Climate

Demographics

Economy

Government
Rizal, belonging to the lone congressional district of the province of Kalinga, is governed by a mayor designated as its local chief executive and by a municipal council as its legislative body in accordance with the Local Government Code. The mayor, vice mayor, and the councilors are elected directly by the people through an election which is being held every three years.

Elected officials

See also
List of renamed cities and municipalities in the Philippines

References

External links
 [ Philippine Standard Geographic Code]
Philippine Census Information
Local Governance Performance Management System

Municipalities of Kalinga (province)